Agder Kollektivtrafikk AS is a public transport administrator for the county of Agder, Norway. It is owned by and works on behalf of Agder County Municipality and based in Kristiansand. It does not operate the transport, but has contracts with operators. The four main bus terminals, in Kristiansand, Mandal, Lyngdal and Flekkefjord are operated by Agder Kollektivtrafikk. It also operates the information system for publishing timetables in both Vest-Agder and Aust-Agder.

References

External links
 Official site

Bus transport in Agder
Companies based in Kristiansand
County-owned companies of Norway
Public transport administrators of Norway
Year of establishment missing